Catherine Correia (born January 28, 1975), is a Venezuelan television actress. She has worked as an actress of telenovelas for Radio Caracas Televisión. She is best known for Carita pintada, Viva la Pepa and La cuaima. She began her acting career in 1995 and ended in 2003.

Filmography

References

External links 

1975 births
Living people
20th-century Venezuelan actresses
21st-century Venezuelan actresses
Actresses from Caracas
RCTV personalities